Eucalyptus rodwayi, commonly known as the swamp peppermint, is a species of small to medium-sized tree that is endemic to Tasmania. It has rough, fibrous to flaky bark on the trunk and branches, narrow lance-shaped adult leaves, flower buds in groups of between seven and eleven, white flowers and conical to hemispherical fruit.

Description
It has rough, greyish fibrous or flaky bark on the trunk and branches. Flowering occurs between December and March and the flowers are white.

Taxonomy and naming
Eucalyptus rodwayi was first formally described in 1902 by Richard Thomas Baker and Henry George Smith in their book A research on the eucalypts of Tasmania and their essential oils. The specific epithet (rodwayi) honours Leonard Rodway for his contribution to botanical research in Tasmania.

Distribution and habitat
Swamp peppermint grows in poorly-drained areas in valleys from the central plateau to the east coast of Tasmania.

See also
List of Eucalyptus species

References

rodwayi
Flora of Tasmania
Myrtales of Australia
Plants described in 1912
Taxa named by Richard Thomas Baker